The Miles M.38 Messenger is a British four-seat liaison and private owner aircraft built by Miles Aircraft.

Design and development

The Messenger was designed to meet an informal request from a group of British Army officers for a robust, slow speed, low maintenance air observation post and liaison aircraft.

The aircraft designed was a cantilever low-wing monoplane with a fixed tailwheel, powered by the de Havilland Gipsy Major 1D inline engine.

Fitted with retractable auxiliary wing flaps enabling a wing loading of around 12.5 lb per square foot, the Messenger had triple fins and rudders in order to maintain sufficient controllability down to the exceptionally low stalling speed of 25 mph.

The prototype was converted from a Miles M.28 Mercury and first flew at Woodley on 12 September 1942, some three months after the approach by army officers. When informally test flown by an Aerial Observation Post Squadron it was declared a success, meeting all the army's requirements, however the Ministry of Aircraft Production, having not been consulted, reprimanded George Miles for failing to seek the ministry's permission before rebuilding the aircraft and no orders for the Miles M.38 were placed for the aerial observation post role, AOP units using light, fixed-wing aircraft, notably various marks of Auster.

During the war George Miles continued to experiment with the prototype and suggested the aircraft (known as the M.38A) could be operated in the anti-submarine role using a small 60 foot (18.29 metre) deck aboard small merchant ships, landing using a simple arrester wire system. This was tried at Woodley using a simulated deck (with passengers simulating the weight of depth charges). No official interest was expressed in this scheme.

However a year later a small order against Specification 17/43 was placed on behalf of the British Royal Air Force for the Messenger I to be employed in the VIP transport passenger transport role.

Wartime users of the type included Marshal of the Royal Air Force 1st Baron Tedder and Field Marshal Sir Bernard Montgomery. (The Messenger shown at the beginning of this article - in the guise of this aircraft - attended the 60th D-Day commemorations at the Imperial War Museum Duxford in 2004.)

Production and operations

Seventeen of the 21 Messenger 1s produced  survived the war, and when retired from RAF duties most were converted for civilian use as the Messenger 4A. They were flown by private pilots and business owners.

In 1944 the prototype was rebuilt as the M.48 Messenger 3 with fully retractable electrically-operated split trailing-edge flaps and a 155 h.p. Cirrus Major III engine. This model was not further developed as it did not provide any advantage over the other variants.

Post-war production centred on the Messenger 2A for the civilian market, aircraft being built at Newtownards in Northern Ireland and flown to Woodley for final fitting out. After 71 aircraft were built, production ceased in 1948; a single example was assembled, from existing parts, in 1950.

Several examples of the type were sold to Australia and others were exported to Argentina, Belgium, Chile, Egypt, Iran, New Zealand, South Africa and Switzerland.

The aircraft was a popular touring and racing aircraft during the late 1940s and early 1950s. In 1954 Harold Wood in G-AKBO won the King's Cup Race air race at 133 mph.

Several examples were still flying in the United Kingdom and New Zealand in early 2011 with private owners and flying groups.

Variants
Messenger 1
Military production aircraft for the Royal Air Force powered by a Gipsy Major ID, 23 built.
Messenger 2A
Civil production aircraft powered by the Blackburn Cirrus Major 3, 65 built.
Messenger 2B
Three-seat variant of the 2A powered by the Blackburn Cirrus Major 3, one built.
Messenger 2C
Same as the 2A but powered by the de Havilland Gipsy Major 1D, one built.
Messenger 3
Dual-control variant of the 2A powered by a Blackburn Cirrus Major 3, one built, later re-designated the M.48.
Messenger 4
Same as the 2A but powered by the de Havilland Gipsy Major 10, three built.
Messenger 4A
Civil version powered by the de Havilland Gipsy Major 1D, one built and 19 converted from Mk I.
Messenger 4B
One 4A modified with a de Havilland Gipsy Major 10 engine.
Messenger 5
One I modified with a Blackburn Bombardier 702 engine.
M.38A Mariner
The prototype Messenger was fitted with an arrester hook for trials as a carrier-based anti-submarine aircraft.
Handley Page HP.93
One Messenger was used by Handley Page (Reading) for test flights using Dufaylite wings at Woodley.

Operators

 Royal Air Force
 Air Kruise

Specification (Messenger 2A)

See also

References

Notes

Bibliography

 Amos, Peter. and Brown, Don Lambert. Miles Aircraft Since 1925, Volume 1. London: Putnam Aeronautical, 2000. .
 Brown, Don Lambert. Miles Aircraft Since 1925. London: Putnam & Company Ltd., 1970. .
 Jackson, A.J. British Civil Aircraft since 1919. London: Putnam & Company Ltd., 1974. .
 Jerram, Mike. "For Business and Pleasure–No. 4: Part 1". Aeroplane Monthly, Vol. 14, No. 10, October 1986. pp. 558–561. 
 Jerram, Mike. "For Business and Pleasure–No. 4: Part Two". Aeroplane Monthly, Vol. 14, No. 11, November 1986. pp. 600–603. 
 Mondey, David. The Hamlyn Concise guide to British Aircraft of World War II. London: Chancellor press, 2002. .
 Simpson, Rod, General Aviation Handbook. Midland Publishing. 2005. 

Miles aircraft
1940s British civil utility aircraft
1940s British military utility aircraft
Single-engined tractor aircraft
Low-wing aircraft
Aircraft first flown in 1942
Triple-tail aircraft